Cocytius is a genus of hawkmoths (family Sphingidae). The genus was erected by Jacob Hübner in 1819.

Species
, the Sphingidae Taxonomic Inventory accepts eight species. The genera Amphonyx, Ancistrognathus, Morcocytius and Pseudococytius are treated as synonyms.
Cocytius antaeus (Drury, 1773)
Cocytius beelzebuth (Boisduval, [1875])
Cocytius duponchel (Poey, 1832)
Cocytius haxairei Cadiou, 2006
Cocytius lucifer (Rothschild & Jordan, 1903)
Cocytius mephisto Haxaire & Vaglia, 2002
Cocytius mortuorum Rothschild & Jordan, 1903
Cocytius vitrinus Rothschild & Jordan, 1903

References

Sphingini
Moth genera
Taxa named by Jacob Hübner